Kwon Gi-pyo (born 26 June 1997) is a South Korean footballer currently playing as a right-back for Pohang Steelers.

Career statistics

Club

Notes

References

1997 births
Living people
Konkuk University alumni
South Korean footballers
South Korea youth international footballers
Association football defenders
K League 1 players
K League 2 players
Pohang Steelers players
Seoul E-Land FC players
FC Anyang players
Sportspeople from Daegu